Episode III, Episode 3 or Episode Three may refer to:

 Star Wars: Episode III – Revenge of the Sith, a 2005 film
Episode 3 (Humans series 1), TV series episode
Episode 3 (Peep Show), TV series episode
Episode 3 (The Tudors), TV series episode
Episode 3 (Skins), TV series episode
Episode 3 (The Casual Vacancy), (2015), the third and final episode of the TV miniseries The Casual Vacancy
Episode 3 (Ashes to Ashes), TV series episode
 Half-Life 2: Episode Three, a canceled video game